Beta-crystallin B2 is a protein that in humans is encoded by the CRYBB2 gene.

Function 

Crystallins are separated into two classes: taxon-specific, or enzyme, and ubiquitous. The latter class constitutes the major proteins of vertebrate eye lens and maintains the transparency and refractive index of the lens. Since lens central fiber cells lose their nuclei during development, these crystallins are made and then retained throughout life, making them extremely stable proteins. Mammalian lens crystallins are divided into alpha, beta, and gamma families; beta and gamma crystallins are also considered as a superfamily. Alpha and beta families are further divided into acidic and basic groups. Seven protein regions exist in crystallins: four homologous motifs, a connecting peptide, and N-terminal and C-terminal extensions. Beta-crystallins, the most heterogeneous, differ by the presence of the C-terminal extension (present in the basic group, none in the acidic group). Beta-crystallins form aggregates of different sizes and are able to self-associate to form dimers or to form heterodimers with other beta-crystallins. This gene, a beta basic group member, is part of a gene cluster with beta-A4, beta-B1, and beta-B3. A chain-terminating mutation was found to cause type 2 cerulean cataracts.

Interactions
CRYBB2 has been shown to interact with Hsp27, CRYGC, CRYAA and CRYAB.

References

External links

Further reading